Joseph Vogel (born September 15, 1973) is an American-Lebanese basketball player.

Vogel attended Colorado State. Upon graduation, he was drafted by the Seattle SuperSonics in the 1996 He played as a professional in Taiwan, Turkey, Japan, Saudi Arabia and on a number of Lebanese basketball teams, including Sagesse Beirut, Champville SC and Sporting Al Riyadi Beirut.

After his naturalization as a Lebanese citizen, he also became a member of the Lebanese national basketball team. At 6'11", he was Lebanon's starting center. The American-Lebanese basketball player currently plays for Hoops Club as a center.

Draft
Vogel was drafted with the 45th overall pick by the Seattle SuperSonics in the 1996 NBA Draft.

College
Vogel attended Colorado State and was ranked second in blocked shots with 180 and 7th all time in games played, with 115 to his credit.

Professional teams 
After Seattle, Vogel joined Turkey's basketball Galatasaray Café Crown for the 1996–97 season. He was, however, replaced by Mills during that season. In 1997, he signed with the Red Wolves basketball team in Japan, and returned to the Seattle SuperSonics at their summer camp to train. Al-Ittihad was Vogel's next stop, in Saudi Arabia for the 1998–99 season.

Vogel arrived to the Lebanon Leprechauns for the 1999–2000 season and signed with Sagesse Beirut. He also took part of some tournaments in the United States in 2000 and 2001. His return to Lebanon gave him the chance to join the Champville basketball team under a five-year contract.

Vogel was part of the Sporting Al Riyadi Beirut basketball team from 2004 until 2013. He won various local championships with Al Riyadi and across Asia. Vogel then played for Homenetmen Beirut, Byblos Club and Hoops Club.

Awards and achievements 
Western Athletic Conference All-Tournament Team −95
Saudi Arabian League Champion −99
WAC 2nd Team -Pre96
Lebanese League Champion −00, 05, 06, 07,08,09,2010.
MVP of the Asian Cup tournament −99
Lebanese National Team −01, 03, 05–07
Mediterranean Games in Tunisia −01
World Championships in Indianapolis (USA) -02
Dubai Tournament Winner −04.
Lebanese Cup Winner −04, 06, 07, 2015.
Lebanese League Regular Season Champion −04, 05, 06, 07
Asia-Basket.com Lebanese League All-Domestic Players Team −04, 05, 06
Asia-Basket.com Lebanese League All-Defensive Team −04, 05
Asia-Basket.com All-Lebanese League Center of the Year −05
Asia-Basket.com All-Lebanese League Domestic Player of the Year −05
Asia-Basket.com All-Lebanese League 1st Team −05
Arab Club Championships −05 (Silver, Asia-Basket All-1st Team), 06 (Winner), 07 (Winner)
World Championships in Japan −06
Asian Games in Doha
Asia-Basket.com All-Arab Club Championships 2nd Team

See also 
 Lebanon national basketball team
 Sporting Al Riyadi Beirut

External links 
 asia-basket.com
 Basket-Stats: Joe Vogel
 Ya Libnan: Lebanon rolls into Basketball Championship Semifinals, 15 September, 2005
 

1973 births
Living people
American emigrants to Lebanon
American expatriate basketball people in China
American expatriate basketball people in Japan
American expatriate basketball people in Saudi Arabia
American expatriate basketball people in Turkey
American men's basketball players
Asian Games competitors for Lebanon
Basketball players at the 2006 Asian Games
Basketball players from Nebraska
Capitanes de Arecibo players
Centers (basketball)
Colorado State Rams men's basketball players
Galatasaray S.K. (men's basketball) players
Lebanese expatriate basketball people in Japan
Lebanese expatriate basketball people in Turkey
Lebanese expatriate basketball people in China
Lebanese expatriate basketball people in Saudi Arabia
Lebanese men's basketball players
Lebanese people of American descent
Naturalized citizens of Lebanon
People from North Platte, Nebraska
Rockford Lightning players
Seattle SuperSonics draft picks
Xinjiang Flying Tigers players
2002 FIBA World Championship players
2006 FIBA World Championship players
Sagesse SC basketball players
Al Riyadi Club Beirut basketball players